The Mercedes-Benz M119 is a V8 automobile petrol engine produced from 1989 through 1999. It was available in 4.2 L; 5.0 L; and 6.0 L displacements. It was a double overhead cam design with 4 valves per cylinder and variable valve timing on the intake side. It was replaced by the 3-valve M113 starting in 1997.

The M119 differed from the M117 in the following ways:

 The engine block uses asbestos-free gaskets and has better oil flow
 The cylinder head is now a 4-valve aluminium unit with dual overhead camshafts
 The connecting rods are forged and enable cooling of the pistons with sprayed oil
 The pistons are iron-coated cast aluminium
 An improved vibration damper system is used
 The aluminium oil pan has bolted-on oil baffles to prevent foaming of the engine oil
 The intake camshaft timing is adjusted hydro-mechanically up to 20°:
 0–2000 rpm — retarded for improved idle and cylinder scavenging
 2000–4700 rpm — advanced for increased torque
 4700+ rpm — retarded for improved volumetric efficiency

Engine Data

4.2
Rare Japanese version 400E 4.2 AMG (16-20 cars) has 312 PS (229 kW; 308 bhp).

Applications:
 W124 400 E / E 420
 W124 400E 4.2 AMG
 W210 E 420
 W140 400 SE / 400 SEL / S 420
 C140 420 SEC / S 420 Coupé / CL 420

5.0

The E50 AMG M119.985 produced  @ 5,550 rpm and  @ 3,200 rpm.

Applications:
 W124 500E / E500
 W140 500SE / 500SEL / S500
 C140 500SEC / S500 Coupe / CL500
 R129 500SL / SL500
 W210 E50 AMG
 CLK LM and CLK LM Straßenversion   (with naturally aspirated version of M119 engine) 
 Sauber C9 (with biturbo)
 Mercedes-Benz C11 (with biturbo)
 De La Chapelle Parcours (2 of 3, 1 concept and 1 production car)

The 5.0 L M119 replaced the M120 V12 in the CLK-GTR race car, for the new generation CLK-LM which then won every race in the FIA GT series, which ultimately resulted in the GT1 class being canceled.

It also won the 1989 24 Hours of Le Mans in the Sauber C9 and was further used in the Mercedes-Benz C11 before being replaced by the M291 3.5L Flat-12 in 1991.

6.0

 W124 E60 AMG
 R129 SL60 AMG
 W210 E60 AMG

For 1994 model year, there were also limited AMG models for Japan which were sold between October 1993 and September 1999 in left-hand drive.
 W463 500 GE 6.0 AMG
 W140 S500-6.0
 C140 S500C-6.0

References

M119
World Sportscar Championship engines
V8 engines
Gasoline engines by model